The women's water polo tournament at the 2019 Southeast Asian Games was held at the New Clark City Aquatics Center, Tarlac, Philippines from 26 November to 1 December 2019. The competition was held in a double round-robin format, where Thailand, winners of the previous two editions, dominated the three-team field en route to the gold medal.

Competition schedule
The following was the competition schedule for the women's water polo competitions:

Squads

Results

All times are Philippine Standard Time (UTC+08:00)

Double Round-robin

See also
Men's tournament

References

women
Southeast Asian Games